TFOU is a French children's television broadcast programming block  on TF1. It was launched on 1 January 2007, replacing TF! Jeunesse (French for TF! Youth).

TF! Jeunesse first appeared on Monday, September 1, 1997 at 4:30 in the afternoon on TF1, replacing Club Dorothée, with the first episode of Beetleborgs. TF! Jeunesse was created by Dominique Poussier, the director of children's television for TF1. It was hoped that this new show would distance itself from its predecessor, whose shows had often been accused by parents and the Conseil supérieur de l'audiovisuel (the Superior Audiovisual Council) of being too violent. Poussier had previously created the morning program Salut les Toons! ("Hello Toons!"), which was presented by two CGI-generated mice, in 1996. In September 1997, she was given the difficult task of revitalizing children's programming on TF1, whose ratings had been in decline thanks to the popularity of Les Minikeums on France 3.

Using the same model which she had already presented with The Planet of Donkey Kong on France 2, Poussier suggested a program without animation. "T. F. Ouais" was chosen as the title for the program. The logo had been that of a defunct channel. An adult voice was the presenter of the show (Bruno Choël, the French dub voice for Johnny Depp in Pirates of the Caribbean and Ewan McGregor in Star Wars).

Interactivity with the young audience was exercised again in special operations like those organized for the presidential elections of 2007 where children were interviewed on the subject. TFOU was praised by the Foundation for Children for its activity on tolerance Parce qu'on est tous différents (Because we are all different") (Directors: Nicolas Sedel, Franck Salomé et Fernando Worcel).

History

The Pokémon Phenomenon and the Revival 
In addition to new European programs, TF1 can rely on agreements with Nickelodeon (which allows it to broadcast Hey Arnold!) or the new Power Rangers series, known in France since 1993. But it is only with the arrival of Pokémon in 2000, that the channel could find audiences equal to those of Club Dorothée. Surfing on this wave, the Digimon quickly appears.

Suppose several series follow one another without making an impression. In that case, a few programs with audiences also appear (Franklin, Jimmy Neutron, Totally Spies!, Sonic Underground) and allow the channel to bounce back and resist Yu-Gi-Oh! in particular.

The success recovery 
After creating tfou.fr, TF1's first children's website, in 2000, the TF1 Group launched the TFOU (TV channel) on the TPS satellite package, drawing inspiration from the TF! Jeunesse, but the channel targets a teenage audience where TF! Jeunesse tried to seduce the youngest. However, the programs become forgotten or unpopular. The flagship series are reserved for broadcast on TF1.

Current series 

 Babar and the Adventures of Badou
 Barbapapa
 Droners
 The Minimighty Kids
 Marblegen 
 Imago
 Miss Moon
 Miraculous: Tales of Ladybug and Cat Noir (2015–present)
 Mirette Investigates
 Robin Hood: Mischief in Sherwood
 The Smurfs
 Totally Spies!

Foreign series

 Calimero (Italy)
 Chuggington (UK)
 Enchantimals (US)
 Franklin and Friends (Canada)
 Go, Diego, Go! (US)
 Heidi (Germany)
 Lassie (US)
 Octonauts (UK)
 PAW Patrol (Canada)
 Polly Pocket (US)
 Rev & Roll (Canada)
 Super Wings (South Korea)
 Thomas & Friends: All Engines Go! (US/Canada)

Former series 

 Argai
 Eliot Kid
 Gazoon
 The Jungle Book
 Kangoo
 Kangoo Junior
 Kid Clones
 Forest Friends
 Les Enquêtes de Geleuil et Lebon
 Marcus Level
 Monster Buster Club
 The Mysterious Cities of Gold
 Ouf le prof!
 Pat and Stan
 Les Petites Sorcières
 Rekkit Rabbit
 Sherlock Yack
 The Amazing Spiez!
 Zig & Sharko

Foreign series 

 64 Zoo Lane (UK)
 The Adventures of Jimmy Neutron: Boy Genius (US)
 All Grown Up! (US)
 Anatole (Canada)
 Avatar: The Last Airbender (US)
 Beast Wars: Transformers (US)
 Billy and Buddy (Belgium)
 Casper's Scare School (US)
 Digimon Adventure (Japan)
 Dora the Explorer (US)
 Dr. Zitbag's Transylvania Pet Shop (UK)
 Flipper and Lopaka (Australia)
 Flying Rhino Junior High (Canada)
 Franklin (Canada)
 The Furchester Hotel (UK)
 Handy Manny (US)
 Hey Arnold! (US)
 Higglytown Heroes (US)
 In The Night Garden (UK)
 Jellabies (Australia)
 Kirby: Right Back at Ya! (Japan)
 Kung Fu Panda: Legends of Awesomeness (US)
 LazyTown (Iceland)
 Little Einsteins (US)
 Lucky Fred (Spain)
 Lucky Star (Japan)
 Maya the Bee (Germany)
 Mickey Mouse Clubhouse (US)
 My Friends Tigger & Pooh (US)
 My Little Pony: Friendship is Magic (US)
 Ni Hao Kai Lan (US)
 Olivia (US)
 Papyrus (Belgium)
 The Penguins of Madagascar (US)
 Pinky Dinky Doo (US)
 Pokémon (Japan)
 Power Rangers: Jungle Fury (US)
 Power Rangers: Operation Overdrive (US)
 Phineas and Ferb (US)
 Rubbadubbers (UK)
 Sabrina's Secret Life (US)
 Shaun the Sheep (UK)
 SpongeBob SquarePants (US)
 Sonic X (Japan)
 Teletubbies (UK)
 Tweenies (UK)
 The ZhuZhus (US)

References

External links
 

French children's television series
TF1 original programming